Patricia Gadelha Pillar (born 11 January 1964) is a Brazilian actress, producer, film director, screenwriter, and television presenter.

Biography

Pillar was born in Brasília, Distrito Federal to Nuno Pillar and Lucy Gadelha. She was born only three months before the 1964 Brazilian coup d'état and due to her father's occupation as a Navy officer, she lived in various places of Brazil, such as Vitória, Espírito Santo and Santos, São Paulo prior to settling in Rio de Janeiro at 14. Pillar always wanted to be an actress, so she started working while in high school in order to pay for her acting lessons.

At 16, she became a photographic model. She studied journalism but gave it up to pursue her dream of becoming an actress. She joined the theatre group Asdrúbal Trouxe o Trombone alongside Regina Casé, before getting her first film role in Para Viver um Grande Amor, alongside singer Djavan. That role granted her a part in the famous 1985 Rede Globo telenovela Roque Santeiro, created by Dias Gomes. Since then, she has starred in twelve other Globo telenovelas. She has also starred in eleven feature films, including the 1995 Academy Award-nominated O Quatrilho, alongside Glória Pires.

In 2005, Pillar debuted as a director. Her first film was a documentary about the Brazilian singer Waldick Soriano and it was titled Waldick - Sempre No Meu Coração (which means, in Portuguese, Waldick - Always In My Heart).

Personal life
Patrícia Pillar was married to the politician Ciro Gomes from the Brazilian Socialist Party. They started dating when Gomes was still legally married to Patrícia Saboya, then senator from Ceará, causing controversy in the media. In 2002, Pillar played an important role in Gomes' presidential campaign, although she was recovering from breast cancer. Prior to that, she was married to MPB singer-songwriter Zé Renato from 1985-95.

Filmography

Film

Television

Director

Plays

Awards

References

External links

1964 births
Living people
Actresses from Brasília
Brazilian television actresses
Brazilian film actresses
Brazilian telenovela actresses
Brazilian female models